The Henry Hickert Building, located at 104 W. 4th in Bird City, Kansas, is a historic building dating from 1920.  It is in Early Commercial style and has also been known as Heritage Corner Cafe.  It was listed on the National Register of Historic Places in 2007.

It is a two-story brick building that "has been a prominent landmark and a part of the community" since 1920.  It has served as a bank, as the post office, as a drugstore, as a restaurant, and as apartments.  It was deemed significant for National Register listing for association with the development of Bird City and as "a good local example" of 20th-century commercial architecture.

References

Commercial buildings on the National Register of Historic Places in Kansas
Buildings designated early commercial in the National Register of Historic Places
Commercial buildings completed in 1920
Buildings and structures in Cheyenne County, Kansas
National Register of Historic Places in Cheyenne County, Kansas